The Temple Challenge Cup is one of the eights races at Henley Royal Regatta at Henley-on-Thames on the River Thames in England. It is open to male crews from universities, colleges or schools. Combined entries from two colleges of the same university, or from different schools, are allowed.

There are restrictions on individual rowers to ensure that the faster crews row in the Ladies' Challenge Plate. A rower cannot take part in this race if he has previously won an event at Henley, except The Thames, The Wyfold, The Britannia, The Prince Albert, The Princess Elizabeth, or The Fawley Challenge Cups. The race is limited to 32 entrants.

The event was first staged in 1990, and, after a successful first year, the Regatta Stewards decided to make it a permanent fixture. The cup, awarded to the winning crew on finals day, was made in 1835 by Charles Fox, and has been engraved with a sketch of the Temple on Temple Island at the start of the regatta course.

There was no foreign winner until 1996, when the United States' Yale University won the final. Since 2000, foreign crews have dominated the event winning 14 times in 18 years with 10 of the winners hailing from the United States. Only Oxford Brookes University Boat Club have broken the foreign stranglehold on the trophy, winning the event in 2006, 2014, 2016, 2017, 2019 and 2022.

Winners

As Henley Prize

As Temple Challenge Cup

Sources
 Historic Henley results

References

Recurring sporting events established in 1990
Events at Henley Royal Regatta
Rowing trophies and awards